Jane Eyre is a 1934 American romantic drama film directed by Christy Cabanne, starring Virginia Bruce and Colin Clive. It is based on the 1847 novel Jane Eyre by Charlotte Brontë, and is the first adaptation to use sound.

Plot 

A Victorian orphan secures a position as governess at Thornfield Hall. She falls in love with her employer.

Cast

Production
Production began 17 May 1934 at General Service Studios.

Critical reception
Critic Leonard Maltin gave the film 2 stars (out of four), describing it as a "[t]hin version of the oft-filmed Bronte novel, produced by Monogram, of all studios[...] Still, it's not uninteresting as a curio."

Soundtrack 
 Adele sings the "Bridal Chorus" from the opera Lohengrin, by Richard Wagner.
 Adele sings "My Bonnie Lies over the Ocean".

References

External links
 
 
 
 
 Review at JaneEyre.net

1934 films
1930s historical romance films
1934 romantic drama films
American romantic drama films
American historical romance films
American black-and-white films
Films directed by Christy Cabanne
Films based on Jane Eyre
Films set in England
Films about nannies
Monogram Pictures films
1930s English-language films
1930s American films